Fimbristylis blakei is a sedge of the family Cyperaceae that is native to Australia.

It blooms between September and October and produces brown flowers.

In Western Australia it is found on sandstone and quartzite hills in the Kimberley region.

References

Plants described in 1990
Flora of Western Australia
acuminata